Aaron's Party (Come Get It) is the second studio album by American pop singer Aaron Carter. It serves as the follow-up to his international debut album. Aaron's Party was released in the fall of 2000 becoming his first album under Jive Records. This album was also certified 3× Platinum by the RIAA for selling over 3 million copies in the United States making it Carter's most successful album.

Synopsis
All of the songs on the album were separated by interludes (except after track 12 for releases with bonus tracks), attached at the end of the previous song (thus the length of the tracks listed below include the length of the interlude). Their lengths spanned from a one-second-long interlude entitled "Let's Go" to a skit over a minute long entitled "Teacher".

In some regions, "(Have Some) Fun with the Funk" (also available on the Pokémon: The First Movie soundtrack) and "Hang On Sloopy" were released as bonus tracks, bringing those releases' total number of songs to 14. Some releases of the album also minorly differ; instead of "Hang On Sloopy" as a bonus track, the UK edition included "Jump, Jump", which also featured on the test pressing of the album. The US version notably omitted "Life Is a Party" (available on the Rugrats in Paris: The Movie soundtrack).

The Japanese edition (as well as having both bonus tracks and a spoken "Aaron Message") had a completely different album cover; some versions of this cover include it being completely orange apart from a circle showing Carter's face at what looks like a party. The full version of this cover is the cover for some editions as well.

Promotion and tour
The songs, "Girl You Shine", "I Want Candy", "Aaron's Party (Come Get It)", "That's How I Beat Shaq", and "Bounce" were played frequently on Radio Disney whereas the videos of "I Want Candy", "That's How I Beat Shaq", "Aaron's Party (Come Get It)", and "Bounce" received heavy rotation on MTV, BET, VH1, Disney Channel and Nickelodeon. He also made several appearances on Nickelodeon and opened up concerts for Britney Spears and the Backstreet Boys. Late in 2000, the album was certified platinum. One of his songs, "Iko Iko" was featured in the 2000 movie The Little Vampire, later included to the soundtrack album which is released ten days before the movie premiere. "Girl You Shine" was featured on Radio Disney Jams, Vol. 2 in early 2000. "Bounce" is featured on Radio Disney Jams, Vol. 4. Carter promoted his album by performing "I Want Candy" on Lizzie McGuire on March 13, 2001. That same month, he and fellow teen star Samantha Mumba performed at a concert held at Disney MGM Studios that aired on the Disney Channel entitled Aaron Carter and Samantha Mumba in Concert. Carter's part of the concert can be seen on the DVD Aaron's Party: Live in Concert along with the music video of "That's How I Beat Shaq" along with clips of him at Disney World, his 13th birthday, and Carter recording his then-upcoming album Oh Aaron. 

Carter embarked on the Aaron's Party Tour in the summer of 2001 with his sister and the A*Teens as the opening act.

Critical reception

The album received mixed reviews from music critics. Jon Azpiri from AllMusic website gave the album two out of five stars and wrote that like "bubblegum acts of the past" the only value of the album is to be "pure kitsch" and the album being "the sort of album you look back on years after its release and mock with ironic glee." David Browne from Entertainment Weekly described the album as "a collection of rhythmic, ultradisposable jingles delivered in the chirpy voice of its leading tyke" and gave the album a C−. Rob Sheffield from Rolling Stone magazine gave the album two out of five stars and wrote that in the album songs Carter "discovers the thrills of impending puberty with a helping hand from "My Internet Girl" and chirps the least metaphorical version of "I Want Candy" ever", he also criticized the singer's voice calling it "too Buffy" and "not Jordy enough".

Track listing
 "Introduction: Come to the Party"  – 0:21
 "Aaron's Party (Come Get It)"  – 3:24 (Interlude: "Candy Call" – 0:38)
 "I Want Candy"  – 3:13 (Interlude: "Big Brother" – 0:27)
 "Bounce"  – 3:19 (Interlude: "Yes!" – 0:10)
 "My Internet Girl"  – 4:00 (Interlude: "I Can See Her Voice" – 0:07)
 "That's How I Beat Shaq"  – 3:25 (Interlude: "Let's Go" – 0:01)
 "The Clapping Song"  – 2:58 (Interlude: "Snappy Burger" – 0:46)
 "Iko Iko"  – 2:41 (Interlude: "Teacher" – 1:05)
 "Real Good Time"  – 3:14 (Interlude: "Lunch at the Studio" – 0:34)
 "Tell Me What You Want"  – 3:12 (Interlude: "Stuffed!" – 0:06)
 "Girl You Shine"  – 3:21 (Interlude: "Big Bad 'Shine-y' Beat Box" – 0:27)
 "Life Is a Party"  – 3:25 (Non-US edition only)
 "(Have Some) Fun with the Funk"  – 3:32 (Bonus track in some regions)
 "Hang On Sloopy"  – 3:21 (Bonus track in some regions)
 "Jump Jump" – 2:37 (Bonus track in some regions)

Charts

Weekly charts

Year-end charts

Certifications

References

2000 albums
Aaron Carter albums
Jive Records albums